Elizabeth Clare Prophet (née: Wulf, a.k.a. Guru Ma) (April 8, 1939 – October 15, 2009) was an American spiritual leader, author, orator, and writer. In 1963 she married Mark L. Prophet (after ending her first marriage), who had founded The Summit Lighthouse in 1958. Mark and Elizabeth had four children. Elizabeth, after her second husband's death on February 26, 1973, assumed control of The Summit Lighthouse.

In 1975 Prophet founded Church Universal and Triumphant, which became the umbrella organization for the movement, and which she expanded worldwide. She also founded Summit University and Summit University Press. In the late 1980s Prophet controversially called on her members to prepare for the possibility of nuclear war at the turn of the decade, encouraging them to construct fallout shelters. In 1996, Prophet handed day-to-day operational control of her organization to a president and board of directors. She maintained her role as spiritual leader until her retirement due to health reasons in 1999.

During the 1980s and 1990s Prophet appeared on Larry King Live, Donahue and Nightline, among other television programs. Earlier media appearances included a feature in 1977 in "The Man Who Would Not Die," an episode of In Search Of... She was also featured in 1994 on NBC's Ancient Prophecies.

Early years

Elizabeth Clare Prophet was born Elizabeth Clare Wulf at Monmouth Memorial Hospital in Long Branch, New Jersey on April 8, 1939, to Hans and Fridy Wulf.  She grew up with her family in Red Bank, New Jersey during the Second World War.  She describes her earliest childhood as idyllic. However, problems arose, such as the detention of her father as a suspected German spy in 1942.  Upon his release he inspired her to help others who may also suffer because of their nationality, race, or religion. After seeing the horrors of the Holocaust in media and print, she became convinced of the reality of absolute evil in the world. This played a main role in her deciding to major in political science in her studies.

One of the major difficulties in her early life was her father's addiction to alcohol.  He verbally abused her mother and had a violent temper which he directed towards them and the destruction of his beloved fish tanks. After witnessing this for many years, Prophet became convinced that when the blood alcohol content creates a chemical imbalance in the body, possessing demons take over the mind and the emotions.

In her early life, she periodically blacked out. This happened in the third grade, when she was about to say her lines in a Christmas play, and recurred throughout her life. Her condition was first diagnosed as petit mal epilepsy, known more commonly today as absence seizures. She did not find medication helpful, and discontinued using it. Her mother later confessed that in 1937 she took some pills in an unsuccessful attempt to abort her pregnancy with Elizabeth. Prophet thought her mother was implying the medication may have contributed to her childhood blackouts. Prophet herself did some research, and believed the use of quinine sulphate could have damaged the developing nervous system and the brain.

Elizabeth Wulf claimed mystical experiences while growing up. She claimed that when she was about four, she had a vision of herself playing on the sands of the Nile river in Egypt.  (Her mother told her that it was a past life.)  She claimed that as a child she felt God's light around her naturally, and heard a sound in her inner ear like that of an ocean wave or the roar of Niagara Falls. While water-skiing, she said she felt she was suspended in a place where other spiritual beings existed, who were joyous in the light, radiating love. This motivated her to find out more about who these "saints robed in white" (Rev. 7:9-17) were, for she had always believed in the "universality of all true religion".

Influences

Wulf grew up in a home that was mainly non-religious except for major holidays. Her father was Lutheran, her mother Catholic. Yet it was her mother's interests in Theosophy, the I AM Activity, and Christian Science that had the most influence on her. In Theosophy and the I AM Activity she heard about the Ascended Masters, Karma, and Reincarnation; in Christian Science she was told that matter was not the only reality and that the spirit part of us made in the image of God was our true nature. Prophet stayed with Christian Science until she met Mark Prophet at the age of 22.

Education
Wulf spent her junior year studying French in Switzerland in 1956, and a year later graduated from Red Bank Regional High School ranked second in her class. She attended Antioch College in Ohio from September 1957 to March 1959 majoring in political science and economics. She transferred to Boston University in September 1959, and graduated with a bachelor of arts degree in political science in August 1961.

Career

In the summer of 1958, Wulf took a co-op job as a camp counselor in a French immersion school in Vermont. She was in charge of a number of high school girls between 15 and 16 years old and her role was to discipline them. She described the experience as frustrating and said she ended up praying to God she might never be put in a position of authority over others.

In the fall of 1958 she served an internship at the United Nations as secretary for Leo Rosenthal, a UN photographer. Her experience at the UN showed her that many of the ambassadors were not there to solve the world's problems. Rather they were engaged in power politics and manipulation of the world's economies. When she left after three months, she was depressed, and held the opinion that, to solve the world's problems people would need to change their concept of themselves and God.

After moving to Boston in 1959, she worked as a secretary for the Christian Science church and The Christian Science Monitor. According to Prophet that is where she learned much about the publishing operations, organization, and administration of a church on a worldwide scale. This would help her later in running her own church.

Wulf claimed she had realized she was intended to be a messenger while meditating with Mark L. Prophet at a public meeting in Boston on April 22, 1961. He had come to teach what he called "the Ascended Masters". She later claimed to have received a vision, while meditating with him, that her role in life was to pass on a higher teaching to further humanity's spiritual evolution. She confided to Mark the next day she was also to be a messenger like him. He accepted her as a student at his mystical school, The Summit Lighthouse. She said she received another vision in June of that year by way of a visitation by the Ascended Master, El Morya, who told her to go to Washington, D.C. to be trained as messenger.

After she attended her first conference in Washington in July, Mark Prophet returned to Boston in August to help her move to Washington to begin her training under him. After her first marriage ended in divorce, they married in 1963 and, upon his death on February 26, 1973, Prophet assumed leadership of the organization. In 1981 the Church Universal and Triumphant purchased the  Forbes Ranch just outside Yellowstone Park, near Gardiner, Montana. In 1986, Prophet relocated her headquarters to that property.

Teachings
The dogma of The Summit Lighthouse included a doctrine called the Path of Personal Christhood, or the way of the soul's one-on-one relationship with God through Christ consciousness. Prophet believed she shared the gift of the word, both written and spoken. She claimed to be in constant communion with God.

The Science of the Spoken Word, as Elizabeth and Mark taught it, was thought to be a gift of sound combined with meditation, prayer and visualization. They believed that a Divine Gift (The Ascension) of union with God was possible.

In 1987, Prophet predicted a first strike by the Soviet Union if America did not implement a missile defense program. She began to admonish her followers to move to Montana and build nuclear fallout shelters for the impending nuclear holocaust.  Adherents started construction of a large bomb shelter in the church compound in Corwin Springs, Montana on land purchased from magazine publisher Malcolm Forbes. Church members not on the staff built private shelters nearby. In April 1990 at Prophet's prompting, the entire community spent the night in their various shelters, communicating with each other by radio. Insiders, however, spread the word that the event might be the real thing. No one knew for sure, and many children believed this could be the end of life as they knew it. Nothing happened, and Prophet's focus took a gradual turn away from nuclear prepping and toward community outreach. Around this same time, the nearly-completed construction was halted by court order when large amounts of stored diesel fuel leaked and contaminated the area.

Final years and death 
Prophet was diagnosed with Alzheimer's disease in November 1998 and she died on October 15, 2009, in Bozeman, Montana. Her five children—Erin, Moira, Tatiana, Sean and Seth—were all still alive at the time of her death. In 2009, her daughter Erin Prophet published Prophet's Daughter: My Life with Elizabeth Clare Prophet Inside the Church Universal and Triumphant, and, in 2016, she contributed a chapter to The Oxford Handbook of New Religious Movements. Prophet's children have largely stayed away from their mother's church. Some are on friendly terms with the group as it is today; others not necessarily. Prophet encouraged all of her children to fill various roles in the organization's leadership and spiritual work. At one time, Elizabeth appointed Erin Prophet as her successor but Erin declined this role. Sean Prophet is an avowed atheist, he has renounced all religions, including his mother's church. Tatiana Prophet is a conservative blogger on Facebook.

Ascended Lady Master Clare 
Those who adhere to the Ascended Master Teachings believe that Elizabeth Clare Prophet made her ascension after her death. She is known by various names which have been given to her by different organizations, including Ascended Lady Master Clare and Ascended Lady Master Clare de Lis.

It is asserted that Lady Master Clare's previous incarnations were:
 Martha of Bethany
 Hypatia
 Clare of Assisi
 Catherine of Siena
 Empress Elisabeth of Austria
 One of the daughters of Tsar Nicholas II, the last sovereign of Imperial Russia

Works 

 Soul Mates And Twin Flames: The Spiritual Dimension of Love and Relationships (Pocket Guide to Practical Spirituality)
 The Lost Years of Jesus: Documentary Evidence of Jesus' 17-Year Journey to the East
 Violet Flame: Alchemy for Personal Change
 How to Work with Angels (Pocket Guides to Practical Spirituality Book 4)
 Access the Power of Your Higher Self (Pocket Guides to Practical Spirituality Book 3) 
 The Great White Brotherhood: In the Culture, History and Religion of America
 The Masters and Their Retreats (by Mark L. Prophet, Elizabeth Clare Prophet, Booth Annice (Editor) )
 The Story of Your Soul: Recovering the Pearl of Your True Identity
Your Seven Energy Centers (A Holistic Approach to Physical, Emotional, and Spiritual Vitality)

Notes

References

External links

 Official Church Universal and Triumphant biography and information about Elizabeth Clare Prophet
 Official Church Universal and Triumphant site of information about Mark and Elizabeth Prophet

1939 births
2009 deaths
People from Long Branch, New Jersey
20th-century apocalypticists
21st-century apocalypticists
American Christian Scientists
American spiritual writers
Antioch College alumni
Boston University College of Arts and Sciences alumni
Converts to Christian Science from Roman Catholicism
Neurological disease deaths in Montana
Deaths from Alzheimer's disease
Former Christian Scientists
Founders of new religious movements
New Age spiritual leaders
New Age writers
People from Red Bank, New Jersey
People with epilepsy
Red Bank Regional High School alumni
Writers from Bozeman, Montana